Pookkari is a 1973 Indian Tamil-language film directed by Krishnan–Panju and produced by Anjugam Pictures. It stars M. K. Muthu, Manjula, Vennira Aadai Nirmala, Jayachitra, Jayakumari and Ambareesh (credited as Amarnath). The film was released on 25 October 1973, and failed commercially.

Plot 
Valli is a flower seller and her brother Srinivasan is a real estate broker. One day, Valli meets a young man (Muthu) and they fall in love. Meanwhile, there is a wealthy man with a daughter, Shyamala. He has a nephew Ravi who is a womaniser. Although Ravi has a mistress, he is also after Muthu's sister, who he eventually rapes. Traumatised by the incident, she loses her voice.

Ravi and Muthu fight frequently, but during one such incident, Jayachitra pleads with Muthu to spare Ravi. During that incident, she also regains her voice and Ravi agrees to marry her. Upon realising this, a shocked Jayamala plans to go to the wedding hall in disguise, with a hidden gun, and shoot Ravi dead. Shyamala learns of Jayamala's plans and rushes to save Ravi, but Valli takes the bullet instead. Before dying, she manages to unite Shyamala and Muthu. Ravi and Jayachitra marry.

Cast 
 M. K. Muthu
 Manjula as Valli
 Vennira Aadai Nirmala as Shyamala
 Jayakumari as Ravi's mistress
 Jayachitra as Muthu's sister
 Amarnath as Ravi

Production 
Pookkari was directed by the duo Krishnan–Panju, and produced under the banner Anjugam Pictures. Panju edited the film under the pseudonym "Panjabi". It was photographed by Amritham, a relative of politician and screenwriter M. Karunanidhi. The story and dialogue were written by T. N. Balu.

Soundtrack 
The soundtrack was composed by M. S. Viswanathan. The song "Kaadhalin Pon Veedhiyil", written by Panchu Arunachalam and sung by T. M. Soundararajan and S. Janaki, attained popularity.

Release 
Pookkari was released on 25 October 1973, and failed commercially. Kalki criticised the film for being anti-progressive towards Tamil cinema.

References

External links 
 

1970s Tamil-language films
1973 films
Films directed by Krishnan–Panju
Films scored by M. S. Viswanathan